The Royal Marines Football Association (RMFA), also known as the Royal Marines FA, is the governing body for association football in the Royal Marines.

History
See footnote.

Inter Services Championships
See footnote.

Inter Regional Competition
The Inter Regional Competition – formerly called the Royal Navy Inter Command Competition – is an annual competition for the Inter Regional Cup.

Tunney Cup
The Royal Marines Annual Football Competition began in 1928, following the presentation of a challenge cup – the USMC Challenge Trophy – to the Corps of Royal Marines, from the United States Marine Corps (USMC), in the hope that the cup would be competed  for by RM association football teams. The Royal Marines named the cup the "Tunney Cup," in honour of the presenter, US Navy Captain J.J. "Gene" Tunney, a former US Marine and former world heavyweight boxing champion.

Wall of Fame
The Royal Marines Football Association (RMFA)  Wall of Fame was established in 1968.

See also
Royal Marines A.F.C.
https://www.royalmarinesfootball.com/
Royal Marines Museum
Royal Navy Football Association
 Army Football Association
Royal Air Force Football Association\

References

External links

County football associations
Football
Military sports governing bodies in the United Kingdom
Military association football